The 2013–14 Iran Super League season was the 24th season of the Iranian basketball league.

Regular season

Standings

Results

Relegation round

|}

Second round

Group A

Group B

Playoffs

Quarterfinals
The higher-seeded team played the first and third leg (if necessary) at home.

|}

Semifinals
The higher-seeded team played the first, second and fifth leg (if necessary) at home.

|}

Third place
The higher-seeded team played the first and third leg (if necessary) at home.

|}

Final
The higher-seeded team played the first, second, fifth and seventh leg (if necessary) at home.

|}

References
 Asia Basket
 Iranian Basketball Federation

Iranian Basketball Super League seasons
League
Iran